Mid-Canterbury was a New Zealand parliamentary electorate in rural Canterbury. It existed from 1928 to 1946 and was represented by six Members of Parliament, including Mary Grigg, the first woman National Party MP.

Population centres
In the 1927 electoral redistribution, the North Island gained a further electorate from the South Island due to fast population growth. Five electorates were abolished, two former electorates were re-established, and three electorates, including Mid-Canterbury, were created for the first time.

History
The electorate existed from 1928 to 1946.

Horace Herring of the Labour Party won the 1935 election. Grigg enlisted in the NZEF as a Major in World War II, and was killed in action in Libya on 29 November 1941. He was succeeded by his widow Mary Grigg at a 1942 by-election; she became the first woman National MP. But in June 1943 she remarried, to another National MP, William Polson, and resigned.

Mary Grigg was succeeded by Geoff Gerard at the 1943 general election. He served until the end of the term in  when the electorate was abolished, and successfully stood in the  electorate instead.

Members of Parliament
Key

Election results

1943 election

1942 by-election

1938 election

1935 election

1931 election

1928 election

Notes

References

Historical electorates of New Zealand
Canterbury, New Zealand
1928 establishments in New Zealand
1946 disestablishments in New Zealand